The Isla de León is a historical name for the piece of land between the city of Cádiz and the Iberian peninsula, in Spain.

In 1813, it was renamed San Fernando in honor of King Fernando VII of Spain for his courage in the defense of the city during the Siege of Cádiz (Peninsular War) by the Napoleonic army.

Costa de la Luz
Municipalities of the Province of Cádiz